Sadriddin Saymatov (born 28 July 1997) is an Uzbekistani karateka. He is a two-time gold medalist at the Islamic Solidarity Games. He also won the gold medal in his event at the 2019 Asian Karate Championships.

Career 

He won one of the bronze medals in his event at the 2016 World University Karate Championships held in Braga, Portugal.

In 2018, he won one of the bronze medals in the men's kumite 60 kg event at the 2018 Asian Games held in Jakarta, Indonesia.

At the 2019 Asian Karate Championships held in Tashkent, Uzbekistan, he won the gold medal in the men's kumite 60 kg event.

In 2021, he competed at the World Olympic Qualification Tournament held in Paris, France hoping to qualify for the 2020 Summer Olympics in Tokyo, Japan. He was eliminated in his third match by Evgeny Plakhutin.

He won one of the bronze medals in the men's kumite 67kg event at the 2022 Asian Karate Championships held in Tashkent, Uzbekistan.

Achievements

References

External links 

 

Living people
1997 births
Place of birth missing (living people)
Uzbekistani male karateka
Karateka at the 2018 Asian Games
Medalists at the 2018 Asian Games
Asian Games medalists in karate
Asian Games bronze medalists for Uzbekistan
Islamic Solidarity Games medalists in karate
Islamic Solidarity Games competitors for Uzbekistan
21st-century Uzbekistani people